Homoeosoma nimbella is a moth of the  family Pyralidae. It is found in Europe.

The wingspan is 16–21 mm. The moths are on wing from May to August depending on the location.

The larvae probably feed on the flowers or fruit of Asteraceae species.

References

External links
 Moths of Suffolk
 Microlepidoptera.nl
 Swedish Museum of Natural History

Phycitini
Moths of Europe
Moths of Asia
Moths described in 1837